The disabled athletics tournament is held since 2009. In the 2009 Games it comprised a demonstration event, the 1500 meters in wheelchair for men, so its champion would not count in the final medal ranking of those Games.

Men's events winners

400 m
2009:  Cândido Cândido

1500 m wheelchair (Demonstration event)
2009:  Francisco Pina

Women's events winners

400 m
2009:  Maria Celeste Manuel

References

D
Parasports competitions